The Institut supérieur européen de formation par l'action (ISEFAC) is a French private business school created in 2000. Located at Paris, Lille, Nice, Bordeaux, Lyon, Nantes, and Brussels, the school provides two courses: ISEFAC Bachelor and ISEFAC Dual education system.

History
The school was created in 2000. The certification delivered by the school was recognized by the French State on 13 November 2009.

Curriculum

ISEFAC Bachelor
ISEFAC Bachelor offers two courses, one in communication and the other in business marketing. They combine a degree with a professional option to choose from nine specialisations: event marketing, press relations / advertising and public, E-communication and communication for E-business, international business of sport, luxury businesses, environmental careers, bank business / marketing.

ISEFAC Dual education system
ISEFAC Dual education system proposes four courses: communication and business, administration, computer science and management.

References

External links
 

2000 establishments in France
Educational institutions established in 2000
Business schools in France
Education in Paris
Education in Nouvelle-Aquitaine
Education in Occitania (administrative region)
Education in Lyon
Education in Lille
Education in Nantes
Education in Brussels

fr:Groupe IONIS#ISEFAC / ISEFAC Bachelor